Arnoud Okken (born 20 April 1982 in Doetinchem) is a Dutch track and field athlete specialising in the 800 metres.

His first international victory came at the 2007 European Athletics Indoor Championships. Commenting on the win, Okken stated that "my plan was to take the lead and keep away from any trouble. Fortunately, I managed to do this." As Bram Som won the 2006 European Athletics Championships, the Netherlands held the European 800 m title both indoor and outdoor.

Achievements

Personal bests
400 metres - 47.84 s
800 metres - 1:45.64 min (2001)
1500 metres - 3:37.46 min (2002)
Mile - 4:07.52 min (2002)

References

External links
 

1982 births
Living people
Dutch male middle-distance runners
People from Doetinchem
Sportspeople from Gelderland
21st-century Dutch people